Stunner or Stunners may refer to:
Stunner (cattle), a mechanical device used in modern cattle slaughter processes
Stunner (missile), an Israeli anti-missile
Stunner (professional wrestling), a professional wrestling attack
Stunner (weapon), a type of fictional weapon that disables an opponent temporarily by knocking them out
Stunner (Stone Age site), a prehistoric settlement
Honda CBF125, a motorcycle called the Stunner in the Indian market
Ray-Ban Aviator, aviator sunglasses nicknamed "stunners"
The Stunners (group), a pop music girl group from Los Angeles
St. Louis Stunners, an American Basketball Association team